The mixed team badminton event at the 2018 Commonwealth Games was held from 5 to 9 April at the Carrara Sports and Leisure Centre on the Gold Coast, Australia.

The teams were drawn into four groups of four teams. The top two teams in each group advanced to the knockout stage. Each tie was player over five matches, one each for men's and women's singles, and men's, women's and mixed doubles. The draw for the group stage was conducted on 6 February 2018.

Group stage

Pool A

Pool B

Pool C

Pool D

Knockout stage

Quarter-finals

Semi-finals

Bronze medal game

Gold medal game

References

Team
Commonwealth